André Paul Schlupp (14 January 1930 – 19 May 2008) was a French basketball player. He competed in the men's tournament at the 1956 Summer Olympics.

References

External links
 

1930 births
2008 deaths
French men's basketball players
Olympic basketball players of France
Basketball players at the 1956 Summer Olympics
Sportspeople from Strasbourg
1954 FIBA World Championship players